This is an incomplete list of Hungarian cardinals of the Catholic Church. The dates in parentheses are the dates of elevation and death. Living cardinals are bolded. Every Archbishop of Esztergom (and the successor office of Esztergom-Budapest) since 1828 has been created cardinal.

13th century
Stephen Báncsa, the first Hungarian cardinal (1251–1270)

14th century
Demetrius (1378–1387)
Bálint Alsáni (1384–1408)

15th century
Dénes Szécsi (1439–1465)
Stephen Várdai (1467–1471)
John Vitéz (1471–1472)
John of Aragon (1477–1485)
Gabriele Rangone (1477–1486)
Ippolito d'Este (1493–1520)

16th century
Tamás Bakócz (1500–1521)
George Martinuzzi (1551)
Antun Vrančić (1573)
Andrew Báthory (1584–1599)
Juraj Drašković (1585–1587)

17th century
Ferenc Forgách (1607–1615)
Péter Pázmány (1629–1637)
Leopold Karl von Kollonitsch (1686–1707)

18th century
Christian August of Saxe-Zeitz (1706–1725)
Imre Csáky (1717–1732)
József Batthyány (1778–1799)

19th century
Sándor Rudnay (1828–1831)
János Scitovszky (1853–1866)
János Simor (1873–1891)
Josip Mihalović (1877–1891)
Lajos Haynald (1879–1891)
Kolos Ferenc Vaszary (1893–1915)

20th century
Károly Hornig (1912–1917)
János Csernoch (1914–1927)
Jusztinián György Serédi (1927–1945)
József Mindszenty (1946–1975)
László Lékai (1976–1986)
László Paskai (1988–2015)

21st century
Péter Erdő (2003–present)

 
Lists of cardinals by country
Cardinals
Cardinals